Patrice M. Arent (born February 3, 1956) was a Democratic member of the Utah State House, representing the state's 36th house district through 2020.

Early life and career

Arent was born February 3, 1956, in Utah. She received her B.S. from the University of Utah in 1978 and her J.D. from Cornell Law School in 1981. Before becoming a member of the House of Representatives, she worked as an Assistant Attorney General in the Utah Attorney General's Office from 1989-1995. She currently lives in Salt Lake City with her husband and two children. She is Jewish.

Political career

Arent was elected to the Utah House of Representatives in 1996 where she has served as Democratic Whip and Assistant Democratic Whip. In 2002, because of legislative redistricting, she would have had to run against another incumbent Democratic representative to remain in her House seat. Rather than run for a fourth term in the House, Arent successfully ran to represent District 4 in the State Senate.  She served in the Utah Senate from 2003 through 2006.

Arent was elected Democratic National Committeewoman from Utah at the 2008 State Democratic Convention. She represented Utah as a "superdelegate" at the 2008 Democratic National Convention in Denver, Colorado, and helped nominate Barack Obama as the Democratic candidate for President of the United States.

In 2010, she returned to public office as the Representative of District 36 in the Utah House of Representatives. She was reelected in 2012 with 60% of the vote. She was reelected in 2014 with 67.8% of the vote.

In 2011, the Utah Democratic Party awarded her the Eleanor Roosevelt Award. The award was presented on October 27, 2011, at This is the Place Heritage Park in Salt Lake City, Utah. She was selected by a committee of past award winners. Past award winners include former Congresswoman Karen Shepherd and State Senator Karen Mayne.

During the 2016 legislative session, Arent served on the Executive Appropriations Committee, the Business, Economic Development, and Labor Appropriations Subcommittee, the House Government Operations Committee, and the House Public Utilities, Energy, and Technology Committee.

2016 sponsored legislation

Arent passed five of the eight bills she introduced, giving her a 62.5% passage rate. She did not floor sponsor any bills during the 2016 general session.

References

External links

1956 births
Living people
Cornell Law School alumni
Democratic Party members of the Utah House of Representatives
University of Utah alumni
Women state legislators in Utah
Lawyers from Salt Lake City
American women lawyers
American lawyers
Women in Utah politics
21st-century American politicians
21st-century American women politicians
Jewish American state legislators in Utah
21st-century American Jews